The Multiple Paths, Beyond-Line-of-Sight Communications (MUBLCOM) satellite (COSPAR 1999-026B, SATCAT 25736), built for the Pentagon's Defense Advanced Research Projects Agency, was launched in May 1999 by a Pegasus. Its mission was to demonstrate a capability to provide space-based digital voice and data communications to combat forces or commercial users that were previously considered out of range of standard radio communications systems.

On April 15, 2005, the Demonstration of Autonomous Rendezvous Technology (DART) spacecraft collided with the MUBLCOM satellite while attempting to rendezvous with it.

References
 http://www.nasa.gov/pdf/148072main_DART_mishap_overview.pdf
 http://science.ksc.nasa.gov/payload/missions/terriers/ 

Communications satellites
Satellites orbiting Earth
Spacecraft launched in 1999
Satellite collisions
Spacecraft launched by Pegasus rockets